The Mummy, Aged 19 is a 2002 Hong Kong film. It was directed by Wilson Yip and produced by Joe Ma Wai-Ho, Y.Y. Kong.

Plot
The film is about a recent high school graduate who is having a hard time after finishing school and is embarrassed by his family and name. After being fired he takes up a new job as a security guard and the place houses two mummies. After trying to impress a girl whose cell phone he picked up after she dropped it he ends up being possessed by a mummy. His family and friends then have to perform an exorcism of sorts in order to save him as well as fend off the mummy's mommy.

Cast
 Tsui Tin-Yau
 Wong You-nam
 Tiffany Lee Lung-Yi
 Wyman Wong
 Benz Hui
 Siu Yeah-Jim
 Yuen King-Tan
 Li Chun-Wai
 Joe Lee Yiu-ming
 Matt Chow
 Chapman To

Awards
 9th Annual Hong Kong Film Critics Society Awards

External links
 
 http://meiah.com/disc_search.php?keyword=the+mummy&lang=tc&page=1&x=0&y=0
 lovehkfilm entry

Hong Kong comedy horror films
2002 films
Films directed by Wilson Yip
Mummy films
2000s Cantonese-language films
2000s Hong Kong films